Mokpo Catholic University is a Catholic university located in Mokpo, South Korea.

References

External links
 Mokpo Catholic University  Official website 

Mokpo
Catholic universities and colleges in South Korea
Universities and colleges in South Jeolla Province
Educational institutions established in 1967